Rokometni klub Krim, commonly referred to as RK Krim or simply Krim, currently named Krim Mercator due to sponsorship reasons, is a women's handball club from Ljubljana, Slovenia. Krim was founded in 1984 and has won the Slovenian Championship a record 27 times. The club has also won the EHF Champions League twice, in 2001 and 2003.

Honours

Domestic
Slovenian Championship
Winners (27): 1995, 1996, 1997, 1998, 1999, 2000, 2001, 2002, 2003, 2004, 2005, 2006, 2007, 2008, 2009, 2010, 2011, 2012, 2013, 2014, 2015, 2017, 2018, 2019, 2020, 2021, 2022
Slovenian Cup
Winners (27): 1993, 1994, 1995, 1996, 1997, 1999, 2000, 2001, 2002, 2003, 2004, 2005, 2006, 2007, 2008, 2009, 2010, 2011, 2012, 2013, 2014, 2015, 2016, 2017, 2018, 2019, 2022
Slovenian Supercup
Winners (7): 2014, 2015, 2016, 2017, 2018, 2019, 2022

International
EHF Champions League
Winners (2): 2001, 2003
Runners-up (3): 1999, 2004, 2006
EHF Champions Trophy
Winners (2): 2003, 2004
Runners-up (1): 2006

Arena
RK Krim play their home league games at Ogrevalna dvorana Stožice with a seating capacity for 700 spectators. For the Women's EHF Champions League matches, they use Arena Stožice.

Name: Ogrevalna dvorana Stožice
City: Ljubljana
Capacity: 700 spectators
Address: Vojkova cesta 100, 1000 Ljubljana

Name: Arena Stožice
City: Ljubljana
Capacity: 12,480 spectators
Address: Vojkova cesta 100, 1000 Ljubljana

Supporters
RK Krim supporters are called Krimovci.

Team

Current squad
Squad for the 2022–23 season

Goalkeepers
 12  Bárbara Arenhart
 16  Zala Miklič
 61  Jovana Risović
Left wingers
 2  Sanja Radosavljević
 8  Ema Abina
 99  Maja Svetik
Right wingers
 4  Jovanka Radičević
 71  Ema Marković
Line players
 3  Manca Jurič
 15  Valentina Klemenčič
 19  Nataša Ljepoja

Left backs
 5  Tjaša Stanko
 14  Laura Cerovak
 23  Betchaïdelle Ngombele
 66  Aleksandra Rosiak
Central backs
 7  Allison Pineau
 9  Nina Žabjek
 11  Daria Dmitrieva
Right backs
 20  Alja Varagić
 25  Barbara Lazović
 48  Sára Kovářová

Transfers 
Transfers for the 2023–24 season

Leaving

  Nataša Ljepoja (to  SCM Râmnicu Vâlcea)

Staff members
Head coach: Dragan Adžić
Assistant coach: Jure Šterbucl
Team leader: Jaka Kravanja
Goalkeeping coach: Rolando Pušnik
Fitness coach: Marko Felja
Physiotherapist: Aldin Muharemović
Team doctor: Klemen Stražar
Video analyst: Matjaž Drolc

Source:

European matches
All results (home and away) list Krim's goal tally first.

Head coach history 
  Cveta Benet (1985–1991)
  Marta Bon (1991–1994)
  Andrej Kavčič (1994–1995)
  Jiří Zerzáň (1995–1996)
  Vinko Kandija (1996–2000)
  Tone Tiselj (2000–2006)
  Robert Beguš (2006–2007)
  Bojan Čotar (2007–2008)
  Marta Bon (2008–2011)
  Tone Tiselj (2011–2014)
  Marta Bon (2014–2016)
  Uroš Bregar (2016–2021)
 Nataliya Derepasko (2021–2022)
 Dragan Adžić (2022–present)

References

External links
Official website 

Handball clubs established in 1984
Slovenian handball clubs
Sports clubs in Ljubljana
1984 establishments in Slovenia